Blood Money is a 1980 Australian film directed by Chris Fitchett and starring John Flaus and Bryan Brown. The plot is about two criminal brothers.

The film was partially funded by the Creative Development Branch of the Australian Film Commission.

References

External links
Blood Money at IMDb
Blood Money at Oz Movies

Australian crime drama films
1980s English-language films
1980s Australian films